Pegomya rufescens is a species of root-maggot flies (insects in the family Anthomyiidae).

References

Anthomyiidae
Articles created by Qbugbot